Tyfarnham is a townland in County Westmeath, Ireland.

Tyfarnham is one of 11 townlands of the civil parish of Tyfarnham in the barony of Corkaree in the Province of Leinster.

The neighbouring townlands are: Killintown to the north, Larkinstown to the east, Galmoylestown Lower to the south–east, Down to the south, Knightswood to the south–west, Culleenabohoge to the west and Multyfarnham or Fearbranagh to the north–west.

In the 1911 census of Ireland there was 1 house and 3 inhabitants in the townland.

References

External links
Map of Tyfarnham at openstreetmap.org
Tyfarnham at the IreAtlas Townland Data Base
Tyfarnham at Townlands.ie
Tyfarnham at The Placenames Database of Ireland

Townlands of County Westmeath